is a baseball stadium in Naka-ku, Yokohama, Japan. It opened in 1978 and has a capacity of 34,046 people.

It is primarily used for baseball and is the home field of the Yokohama DeNA BayStars. The stadium features dirt around the bases and pitcher's mound, but with dirt colored turf infield and base paths. The entire green portion of the field is also turfed.

It hosted an Australian rules football match and drew the second largest crowd for such an event outside of Australia.

Concerts

Santana and Masayoshi Takanaka performed at the stadium on August 2, 1981.

Anzen Chitai performed at the stadium on August 31, 1985. The live performance titled "One Night Theater 1985" was recorded and released on VHS on December 21, 1985, and on LaserDisc and Video High Density on January 25, 1986. The performance was released on CD and DVD on August 19, 1998.

Michael Jackson performed at the stadium during his Bad World Tour in five sold-out concerts, more than any other artist in Yokohama, for a total audience of 240,000 fans (about 48,000 people per concert) on September 25, 26, and 27, 1987 and October 3–4, 1987 and the September 26 Concert was recorded and released as VHS titled Michael Jackson Live in Japan, and is also available on YouTube in its Entirety.

Tina Turner played 4 concerts for the first time at the stadium in March 1988 during Break Every Rule Tour.

Madonna performed, on three consecutive nights, during her Blond Ambition World Tour on April 25–27, 1990. The final date was recorded and released on July 25, 1990, as a VHS and Laserdisc exclusively in Japan, titled Blond Ambition – Japan Tour 90.

Bon Jovi played 3 sold-out concerts here on their These Days tour in May 1996. The second date was broadcast on WowWowTV.

Luna Sea performed a Christmas concert here on December 23 as the final performance of their 1996 tour. There they announced a yearlong hiatus for the members to perform solo activities. The concert was later released as the Mafuyu no Yagai DVD in 2003.

Nana Mizuki performed a concert here on August 3 as the final performance of her 2014 domestic tour, which drew a crowd of about 32,000 fans, making it the biggest local artist event ever held here.

In September 2014, ONE OK ROCK held a 2-day concert in front of a crowd of 60,000 people called "Mighty Long Fall Live at Yokohama Stadium 2014".

Sports

Yokohama Stadium served as the baseball and softball venue at the 2020 Summer Olympics.

Ever since moving to Yokohama in 1978 from Tokyo, the Yokohama DeNA BayStars have called Yokohama Stadium home.

References

External links 

Sports venues in Yokohama
Nippon Professional Baseball venues
Cricket grounds in Japan
American football venues in Japan
Football venues in Japan
Australian rules football grounds
Sports venues completed in 1978
Yokohama DeNA BayStars
Naka-ku, Yokohama
Venues of the 2020 Summer Olympics
Olympic baseball venues
Olympic softball venues
1978 establishments in Japan